The Heart of Things: Live in Paris is a live album by John McLaughlin, released in 2000 through the record label PolyGram. The album reached number 25 on Billboard's Top Jazz Albums chart.

Track listing
All tracks composed by John McLaughlin; except where indicated
 "Seven Sisters" – 8:30
 "Mother Tongues" – 12:57
 "Fallen Angels" – 10:33
 "Divide" (Gary Thomas) – 16:41
 "Tony" – 13:56
 "Acid Jazz" – 14:53

Personnel
Musicians
 Dennis Chambers – drums
 Matthew Garrison – bass guitar
 John McLaughlin – electric guitar
 Otmaro Ruíz – keyboards
 Gary Thomas – soprano sax, tenor sax
 Victor Williams – percussion

Production
 Jean-Philippe Allard – executive producer
 Alain Frappier – graphic design
 Philippe Gaillot – engineer
 Lïla Guilloteau  – assistant production coordination
 Sven Hoffman – house sound, technical assistance
 Vincent Lignier – photography
 Denis Majorrell – cover photo
 John McLaughlin – producer, technical assistance
 Maureen Murphy – release coordinator
 John Newcott – release coordinator
 Christian Pégand – production consultant
 Daniel Richard – executive producer
 Christian Struwe – monitor engineer

Chart performance

References

2000 live albums
John McLaughlin (musician) live albums
PolyGram live albums